John Forster (1817–1878) was a British Whig politician.

Forster was elected Whig MP for Berwick-upon-Tweed at a by-election in 1853—held after his father Matthew Forster and Radical MP John Stapleton were unseated due to bribery and treating during the 1852 general election. He held the seat until 1857 when he did not seek re-election.

References

External links
 

UK MPs 1852–1857
1817 births
1878 deaths
Whig (British political party) MPs for English constituencies